The 2019 JC Ferrero Challenger Open was a professional tennis tournament played on clay courts. It was the second edition of the tournament which was part of the 2019 ATP Challenger Tour. It took place in Alicante, Spain between 1 and 7 April 2019.

Singles main-draw entrants

Seeds

 1 Rankings are as of 18 March 2019.

Other entrants
The following players received wildcards into the singles main draw:
  Carlos Alcaraz
  Jordan Correia
  Álvaro López San Martín
  Jannik Sinner
  Carlos Taberner

The following players received entry into the singles main draw using their ITF World Tennis Ranking:
  Javier Barranco Cosano
  Riccardo Bonadio
  Raúl Brancaccio
  David Pérez Sanz

The following players received entry from the qualifying draw:
  Orlando Luz
  Denis Yevseyev

Champions

Singles

 Pablo Andújar def.  Pedro Martínez 6–3, 3–6, 6–4.

Doubles

 Thomaz Bellucci /  Guillermo Durán def.  Gerard Granollers /  Pedro Martínez 2–6, 7–5, [10–5].

References

2019 ATP Challenger Tour
2019 in Spanish tennis
April 2019 sports events in Spain